Caroline Parkhurst Lloyd (1924–1980) was an American composer and pianist. Her best-known composition was the Spanish-language opera Doña Bárbara performed in the Teatro Municipal of Caracas, July 1967. The opera's libretto was provided by Isaac Chocrón based on the novel Doña Bárbara by Rómulo Gallegos.

Lloyd grew up in Santa Fe, New Mexico and graduated from the University of New Mexico in 1945. She later studied with Bernard Rogers at the Eastman School of Music.

References

1924 births
1980 deaths
American women composers
Eastman School of Music alumni
Musicians from Santa Fe, New Mexico
20th-century classical composers
Pupils of Bernard Rogers
Women classical composers
20th-century American women pianists
20th-century American pianists
20th-century American composers
20th-century women composers